The 1943 Tipperary Senior Hurling Championship was the 53rd staging of the Tipperary Senior Hurling Championship since its establishment by the Tipperary County Board in 1887.

Thurles Sarsfields were the defending champions.

Éire Óg Annacarty won the championship after a 4-03 to 2-04 defeat of Moycarkey-Borris in the final. It remains their only championship title.

References

Tipperary
Tipperary Senior Hurling Championship